Pankaj Rajesh Bhoyar is a member of the 13th Maharashtra Legislative Assembly. He represents the Wardha Assembly Constituency. He belongs to the Bharatiya Janata Party. Bhoyar's election victory has resulted in BJP winning two seats in Wardha district for the first time ever. In 2014, Bhoyar has been a newcomer to the BJP, and is considered as being from the Datta Meghe group. Bhoyar has been president of Wardha district Indian Youth Congress.

References

Maharashtra MLAs 2014–2019
People from Wardha
Year of birth missing (living people)
Living people
Maharashtra politicians
Bharatiya Janata Party politicians from Maharashtra
Maharashtra MLAs 2019–2024